Space Paranoids is a first-person shooter arcade game appearing and featured in the 1982 movie Tron. According to the plot, it was created by Kevin Flynn but the code was stolen and released by ENCOM and the villain Ed Dillinger. In the movie Flynn is seen playing the game in his arcade.

An actual playable game based on what appears in the movie was designed and released by 42 Entertainment, a company that specializes in alternate reality games, for the 2009 San Diego Comic-Con International. Instead of being credited to its real developer, it is credited to "Encom" (the fictional company in the Tron films) with a release date of 1982; the high score record holder is supposedly "Flynn" (the main character in Tron).

Overview
The object of the game is to go through the levels and score as many points as possible by destroying Recognizers, tanks and stationary gun turrets.

The game is designed to look and feel like its movie appearance: for this, the controls of the arcade version are a joystick and a trackball

Technical details
The game is based on the Unity game engine which allows it to run from the browser, provided that the appropriate browser extension is installed. The default controls for the online version are a keyboard and mouse, but if it is downloaded to play offline, it will be possible to configure it for joystick support, full screen and custom resolutions.

Space Paranoids opened online on May 6, 2010.

References

External links
 Description of "Flynn Lives" viral campaign

2009 video games
Arcade video games
Arcade-only video games
Fictional video games
First-person shooters
Retro-style video games
Trackball video games
Tron video games
Video games developed in the United States